Exit... Stage Left is the second live album by the Canadian rock band Rush, released as a double album in October 1981 by Anthem Records. After touring in support of their eighth studio album Moving Pictures (1981), the band gathered recordings made over the previous two years and constructed a live release from them with producer Terry Brown. The album features recordings from June 1980 on their Permanent Waves (1980) tour, and from March 1981 on their Moving Pictures tour.

The album received a mostly positive reception from music critics and reached number 6 in the United Kingdom, 7 in Canada, and 10 in the United States. It was certified platinum by the Recording Industry Association of America for selling one million copies in the latter country. A same-titled home video was released in 1982 that documents the band on the Moving Pictures tour. Exit... Stage Left was voted the ninth best live album of all time by Classic Rock magazine in 2004.

Recording and production 
Side two of Exit... Stage Left was recorded from June 10–11, 1980 at The Apollo in Glasgow, Scotland, during the band's tour for their seventh studio album, Permanent Waves. The remaining three sides were recorded on March 27, 1981 at The Forum in Montreal, Canada during the subsequent tour of their eighth album, Moving Pictures.

After the 1981 tour, the band retreated to Le Studio in Morin Heights in Quebec, Canada to edit and mix the recordings they had made on the two tours, which Peart noted totalled over 50 reels of two-inch tape. The band went through the material to find the best performances for inclusion for a live album. They found a technical fault or a wrong note was enough to affect an otherwise acceptable performance, so they opted to edit the faults using parts from the collection of tapes. In 1993, Lee revealed the band had to add in new sections in the studio to correct passages with out of tune guitars. Neither member is credited to the album's production, who left the duty to their longtime producer, Terry Brown. During the production, Rush wrote and recorded "Subdivisions", a new song that would be released on their following studio album, Signals.

Upon the album's completion, Peart said the group were happier with Exit... Stage Left than with their first live album All the World's a Stage, noting that the latter suffered from uneven sound quality. In subsequent years however, Lee developed a more critical view of Exit... Stage Left, noting that the group tried to make it sound "too perfect" in part by reducing the levels of audience noise, while Lifeson for his part thought the album sounded too clean and not as raw as All the World's a Stage, and as a consequence the band aimed to reach a "middle ground" between the two with A Show of Hands, Rush's third live release. Nevertheless, the album remains a fan favorite.

Rush performs a short rendition of "Ebb Tide" before "Jacob's Ladder". "Broon's Bane" is a short classical guitar arrangement performed by Lifeson as an extended intro to "The Trees." The song is named after Terry Brown, nicknamed "Broon" by the band. The song is not featured on any other live or studio recording by Rush. Also on the album, Lee refers to Brown as "T.C. Broonsie" when introducing "Jacob's Ladder".

The original CD issue removed "A Passage to Bangkok", as CDs could only hold 75 minutes at the time. It was included on the 1997 remaster, as CD capacity had increased to 80 minutes by that time. Before the remastered version was released, the same live version of "A Passage to Bangkok" was released on the compilation Chronicles in 1990.

The second verse of "Beneath, Between, & Behind" is omitted. On "La Villa Strangiato", the introductory classical guitar solo from the original recording is played on electric guitar and doubled in length, Lee sings part of a nursery rhyme in Yiddish during the "Danforth and Pape" section (the liner notes include a translation of his words), and a short bass and percussion solo is added before the "Monsters! (Reprise)" section.

Title 
The title comes from the catchphrase of the Hanna-Barbera cartoon character Snagglepuss. The term "stage left" is a stage direction used in blocking to identify the left side of a theater from the point of view of the performer, as opposed to the point of view of the audience.

Artwork 
An item from each of Rush's previous eight studio album covers can be seen on the front and back cover of this live album, though each has been modified in some way. The snowy owl from Fly by Night flies above Apollo, the man in the suit from Hemispheres, who stands next to Paula Turnbull, the woman from Permanent Waves. The puppet king from A Farewell to Kings sits atop a box stenciled with the band logo from Rush. Next to him is a painting of the Caress of Steel album cover, held by one of the movers from Moving Pictures, with another mover standing behind. Next to this is Dionysus, the nude man from Hemispheres. Behind this scene, the starman from 2112 hangs in the background, next to an "EXIT" sign. The scene was shot in Toronto's then-abandoned Winter Garden Theatre.

Rush's first live album, All the World's a Stage, is also represented by the cover's background image, taken at a concert at the Buffalo Memorial Auditorium in Buffalo, New York. Both album covers show Rush's live setup on an empty stage, although the band no longer used the white carpet by the time of Exit... Stage Lefts release.

Reissues 
A limited-edition promotional 6-track vinyl sampler: Rush 'N' Roulette, included excerpts of six tracks from Exit...Stage Left. The promotional album used a unique mastering process in which concentric grooves were inscribed so that different material would be played depending on where the stylus was put down on the record's surface.

Exit... Stage Left was re-released on CD in 1997 as part of the "Rush Remasters" series.
 The tray has a picture of three fingerprints, light blue, pink, and lime green (left to right, mirroring the cover art of Retrospective II) with "The Rush Remasters" printed in all capital letters just to the left. All remasters from Moving Pictures through A Show of Hands are like this.
 Includes the track "A Passage to Bangkok" which was left off the original CD issue due to time constraints.
 On some copies, each of the band members' photos are reversed from the original. This error has since been corrected on post-1997 reissues of Exit... Stage Left.

Exit... Stage Left was remastered again in 2011 by Andy VanDette for the "Sector" box sets, which re-released all of Rush's Mercury-era albums. It is included in the Sector 2 set.

Exit... Stage Left was remastered for vinyl in 2015 by Sean Magee at Abbey Road Studios as a part of the official "12 Months of Rush" promotion. The high definition master prepared for this release was also made available for purchase in a 24-bit/48 kHz digital format at several high-resolution audio online music stores. These remasters have significantly less dynamic range compression than the 1997 remasters and the "Sector" remasters by Andy VanDette. Sean Magee remastered the audio from an analog copy of the original digital master, using a 192 kHz sample rate. But since Exit... Stage Left was originally mixed on digital equipment at 16-bit/44.1 kHz, no audio above 22 kHz exists in the original digital master or any of the remasters, which is why many digital music stores are only selling the album at a maximum sample rate of 48 kHz.

Track listing

Personnel 
 Geddy Lee – lead vocals, bass guitar, synthesizers, keyboards, Moog bass pedal synthesizer, rhythm guitar on "A Passage to Bangkok" and "Xanadu"
 Alex Lifeson – electric and acoustic guitars, Moog bass pedal synthesizer, backing vocals
 Neil Peart – drums, percussion

Charts

Certifications

References

External links
 

1981 live albums
Anthem Records live albums
Rush (band) live albums
Mercury Records live albums
Albums recorded at the Montreal Forum
Albums produced by Terry Brown (record producer)